Raymond Ian Page (25 September 1924 – 10 March 2012) was a British historian of Anglo-Saxon England and the Viking Age. As a renowned runologist, he specialised in the study of Anglo-Saxon runes.

Biography
Page was born in Sheffield in 1924, and was educated at King Edward VII School. His family circumstances required him to leave school at the age of 16. In 1942 he took a course in mechanical engineering at Rotherham Technical College, applying thereafter for a commission in the Royal Navy. After the war, on discharge from the Navy, he was able as an ex-serviceman to obtain a place as an undergraduate at the University of Sheffield. After graduating in English, he spent a year in Copenhagen working on an MA. He then moved to the University of Nottingham, where he was appointed to an assistant lectureship in English in 1951 and completed his doctoral dissertation on The Inscriptions of the Anglo-Saxon Rune-Stones in 1959.

In 1962, Page joined the faculty at the University of Cambridge, where he was a lecturer, and later reader, in Old Norse language and literature. In 1965 he was appointed Parker Librarian at the Parker Library, Corpus Christi College, and in 1984 he was appointed Elrington and Bosworth Professor of Anglo-Saxon. He held these two prestigious posts until his retirement in 1991. He continued to work at Corpus Christi after his retirement in an out-of-the-way office which he called 'Paradise' because it was so hard to reach.

Academic reputation
Rudolf Simek said that Page "is widely acknowledged as the authority on Old English runes". Professor Elmer Antonsen of the University of Illinois at Urbana–Champaign has noted that "serious study of English runes without Raymond Ian Page... is simply inconceivable"; others praise him as a "meticulous scholar". Page's An Introduction to English Runes was first published in 1973, and revised and republished in 1999. Page intended it as a prefatory publication to a complete corpus edition of Anglo-Saxon runes, and it was praised for, among other qualities, its "healthy skepticism". Even in 2003, it remained "the only book-length study providing a comprehensive and scholarly guide to the Anglo-Saxon use of runes", and the revised edition was deemed as authoritative as the first one was in the 1970s. Much of his work was aimed at a general readership, but many of his scholarly articles were collected in 1995 in Runes and Runic Inscriptions: Collected Essays on Anglo-Saxon and Viking Runes.

Page called himself a 'sceptical' runologist, demonstrating that runes were most often used for mundane purposes and arguing against their 'romantic' association with the occult.

In 1996 he was awarded an honorary doctorate at The Norwegian University of Science and Technology (NTNU).

Personal life
In 1953 Page married Elin Hustad; they had two daughters and a son. True to his Yorkshire roots, he would not permit red roses in his garden. Known as a connoisseur of real ale and single-malt whisky, he was presented on his 70th birthday with an oak manuscript conservation box specially made to contain a bottle of whisky, with its spine embossed with the title The Runes of Jura.

Works
 1960. Gibbons saga. Copenhagen: Editiones Arnamagnænæ, Series B, vol 2.
 1970. Life in Anglo-Saxon England. London: Batsford.
 1973. An Introduction to English Runes. London: Methuen. 2nd ed. Boydell Press, 1999 (2006). .
 1985. Anglo-Saxon Aptitudes. Cambridge: Cambridge University Press. .
 1987. "A Most Vile People": Early English Historians on the Vikings. London: Viking Society for Northern Research.
 1987. Runes. (Reading the past series). London: British Museum Press. .
 1990. Norse Myths. London: British Museum Press. .
 1995. Chronicles of the Vikings: Records, Memorials and Myths. London: British Museum Press. .
 1995. Runes and Runic Inscriptions: Collected Essays on Anglo-Saxon and Viking Runes. Woodbridge: Boydell Press. .
 1999. The Icelandic Rune-Poem. London: Viking Society for Northern Research. .

References

Elrington and Bosworth Professors of Anglo-Saxon
English historians
English librarians
Fellows of Corpus Christi College, Cambridge
Old Norse studies scholars
People educated at King Edward VII School, Sheffield
Royal Navy officers of World War II
Runologists
1924 births
2012 deaths
Alumni of the University of Sheffield
Academics of the University of Nottingham
Corresponding Fellows of the Medieval Academy of America
Writers on Germanic paganism